Kemi is a town and municipality of Finland.

Kemi may also refer to:

Places
Kemi, Iran, village in Northwest Iran
Kem, Russia, town in the Republic of Karelia, Russia, locally known as Kemi

Finland
Kemi River, Finland
Kemi-Tornio sub-region, region of Finland
Kemi Church
Kemi railway station
Kemi-Tornio Airport**Kemi mine

People
Kemi Adekoya (born 1993), Nigerian-Bahraini track hurdler
Kemi Badenoch (born 1980), British politician
Kemi Olusanya (1963–1999), English drum and bass DJ
Kémi Séba (born 1981), Black French activist and political leader
Oluwafunmilayo Kemi Jimoh (born 1984), American long jumper
Philip Kemi (born 1991), Swedish ice hockey player
Restituta Joseph Kemi (born 1971), Tanzanian long-distance runner

Others
1508 Kemi, Mars-crossing asteroid named after the Finnish town and river
1949 Kemi strike, industrial action in Kemi, Finland
Kemi Oba culture, Eastern Europe culture around 3000 BC
Kemi Sami language, extinct language originating in Finland
Kentucky Employers' Mutual Insurance, American insurance company known as KEMI

See also
Kem (disambiguation)